Adam Nergal Darski (born Adam Michał Darski, 10 June 1977), often referred to by his stage name Nergal, is a Polish musician and television personality. He is best known as the frontman of extreme metal band Behemoth.

Career 

Nergal was born Adam Michał Darski in Gdynia, raised Catholic, and started playing guitar at age eight. He goes by the stage name Nergal (naming himself after a Babylonian deity), and he is the founder, lyricist, main composer, frontman and manager of the band Behemoth, which he started when he was still a teenager. He also plays lead, rhythm and acoustic guitar. For a brief time, he used the alias Holocausto, inspired by Beherit leader Nuclear Holocausto. In the late 1990s, he was a vocalist and guitarist of the Danzig-influenced band, Wolverine, which was showcasing Nergal's capability of clean singing. He is also known for his contributions with the following bands: Hermh, Nile, Damnation, Vader, Sweet Noise, Mastiphal, December's Fire, Mess Age, Corruption, Hangover, Ex Deo, and Hefeystos.

Inspired by Norway's Black Circle, Nergal formed together with Blasphemous (from the band Veles) and Venom (from Xantotol) the Temple of Infernal Fire. Later other bands joined and far-right politics were introduced, and the group renamed the Temple of Fullmoon. Nergal then distanced himself from the group, mainly because he had no interest in politics. This led to remaining members of the Temple of Fullmoon to accuse Behemoth of betrayal and caused tensions between Nergal and Rob Darken, frontman of the Polish NSBM band Graveland, leading to death threats. Several years later, the tensions are gone and Nergal and Darken are in good terms nowadays, or as Nergal said in an interview: "We don't share the same interests but we share a mutual respect."

Nergal has completed six years of history, including one year of Latin at University of Gdańsk, and is qualified to be a museum curator.

In 2009, ESP guitars released the first Nergal's signature guitar. It is a 7-string guitar with a V-style body, which is called the "Hex-7".

In March 2010, Nergal was held on trial in Poland on blasphemy charges for publicly denouncing religion by ripping up a Bible on stage in 2007. Nergal made the argument that he has artistic license to enhance his live performances by doing such an action, and suggested that it was not meant to be offensive. He also supported that freedom of speech should come before religion in Poland. He faced up to two years in prison due to the Bible-tearing, but Darski's charges were dropped on 28 June 2010.

In 2011, he assumed the position of a coach on the Polish TV show The Voice of Poland.

In July 2012, Nergal became the newest spokesman for Demon Energy drinks that would be distributed throughout Poland. Nergal appeared in full Behemoth attire on the front of four different flavors of the Demon Energy brand alongside the brand's slogan of "No Limits, No Laws". Darski reportedly donated the majority of funds for this limited edition placement to one of the world's most renowned bone marrow donor centers.

In October 2012, Nergal returned to the Polish Supreme Court regarding the 2007 incident where he tore up a bible and denounced the Catholic Church. The Supreme Court ruled that Darski could be guilty of the
crime of "offending religious feelings" even though he did not act with the "direct intention" of doing so. The case was returned to a lower court which found him guilty of "intentionally insulting the Holy Bible" but the following appeal dismissed the case due to the statute of limitations.

Personal life
From mid-2009 through early 2011, he was in a highly publicized relationship with Dorota Rabczewska, a Polish pop singer professionally known as Doda. On 17 March 2011, News.pl reported the couple had called off the engagement and broken up.

In 2012, Darski legally changed his middle name to 'Nergal'.

Since 2014, Nergal has been the co-owner of three barbershops in Poland—two in Warsaw and one in his hometown, Gdańsk. In 2015 he opened a nightclub in Sopot named Libation.

Health

On 8 August 2010, Nergal was rushed to the hematology ward of the Gdańsk Medical University Hospital for treatment of a then-undisclosed illness. All Behemoth shows through November 2010, including a Russian and North American tours, were cancelled. On 24 August 2010, Darski was diagnosed with leukemia. The illness was thought to have advanced far enough to make chemotherapy ineffective, but such reports have since been proven false. His then-fiancée Dorota Rabczewska-Stępień offered to donate her marrow, but her marrow didn't match. On 8 November 2010, following his then-girlfriend's appeal to the wider public, which has been met with a great response, Darski underwent treatment to receive a bone marrow transplant.

Nergal was discharged from the Uniwersyteckie Centrum Kliniczne (UCK) hospital in Gdańsk on 16 January 2011, three weeks after undergoing bone marrow transplantation. "Adam feels good and is resting comfortably but cannot see any visitors as he can’t risk viral infections", said his ex-fiancée, Doda. However, Nergal was readmitted to the hematology division of Uniwersyteckie Centrum Kliniczne (UCK) in Gdańsk after he developed an infection six weeks later. At the time, it was not immediately clear if the infection would affect Nergal's adoption of the bone marrow transplant and how long he would have to remain in hospital. On 30 March 2011, MetalSucks published an interview with Nergal where he said that his health was improving. As of the interview, he had been out of the hospital for several weeks, and, according to Darski, "everything is going according to plan".

Me and that Man
Nergal started a solo project alongside John Porter called Me and that Man, which focuses on country, blues and folk. The project's debut album titled Songs of Love and Death was released on 24 March 2017. The project's follow-up album, New Man, New Songs, Same Shit, Vol. 1 was released on 27 March 2020, and features guest vocals from Corey Taylor, Niklas Kvarforth, Matt Heafy, Ihsahn, and others.

Publications 
 A. Darski, P. Weltrowski, K. Azarewicz, Spowiedź heretyka. Sacrum Profanum, G+J Gruner+Jahr Poland 2012,

Equipment

 Guitars
 B.C. Rich Warlock 6 string
 Jackson Kelly 6 string
 Jackson Rhoads 6 string
 Gibson Flying V 6 string
 Gibson Explorer (EMG 81/85 Setup) 6 String
 Ibanez RG 7620 7 string
 Mayones Signum Gothic 6 String
 Flame EXG Custom 7 string
 Dean V 6 string
 ESP LTD EC-1000 6 string
 ESP LTD Ninja-600 Michael Amott Signature 6 String
 ESP STEF-7 7 string
 ESP M-7 Super Long Scale 7 string
 ESP V Custom 6 String
 ESP LTD HEX-7 Nergal Signature 7 String
 ESP V-II
 Gretsch White Falcon
 ESP LTD PHOENIX-1000
 ESP LTD Nergal-6
 ESP LTD Nergal NS-6

 Mark L Rack
 Mark L MIDI Control System F-25
 Mark L Loop & Switch LS-14
 Mark L Power Station Custom
 Mark L Mini Line Mixer
 Eventide Time Factor
 Ibanez TS-808
 Boss Pitch
 ISP Decimator Pro Rack G
 Dunlop Custom Rack Wah
 Mogami Cable
 Furman Power
 Korg DTR 1 Tuner
 Neutrik & Switchcraft

 Amplifiers
 Laboga Mr. Hector
 Krank Krankenstein
 Hellstone Prodigy
 Mesa Dual Rectifier
 Bogner Uberschall
 Sommatone Signature Outlaw Head
 Other
 Morley wah pedal
 Nologo Behemoth custom picks

Discography

Behemoth

Me and that Man
Songs of Love and Death (2017)
New Man, New Songs, Same Shit: Vol. 1 (2020)
New Man, New Songs, Same Shit: Vol. 2 (2021)

Guest appearances 
Mastiphal – Nocturnal Landscape (1994; drums)
Hermh – Crying Crown of Trees (1996; bass guitar)
December's Fire – Vae Victis (1996; vocals)
Damnation – Coronation (1997; bass guitar)
Hefeystos – Psycho Cafe (1998; vocals)
Hangover – Terrorbeer (2002; vocals)
Vader – Revelations (2002; vocals)
Mess Age – Self-Convicted (2002; vocals)
Corruption – Orgasmusica (2003; vocals)
Sweet Noise – Revolta (2003; vocals)
Frontside – Teoria Konspiracji (2008; vocals)
The Amenta – n0n (2008; vocals)
Ex Deo – Romulus  (2009; vocals)
Vulgar – The Professional Blasphemy (2010; vocals)
Czesław Śpiewa – Pop (2010; vocals)
Root – Heritage of Satan (2011; vocals)
Voodoo Gods – Shrunken Head (2012; vocals)
Grzegorz Skawiński – Me & My Guitar (2012; guitar)
Maciej Maleńczuk – Psychocountry (2012; vocals)
Rome – The Lone Furrow (2020; vocals)
Ibaraki - Rashomon (2022; vocals)

Filmography 
 Historia polskiego rocka (2008, documentary, directed: Leszek Gnoiński, Wojciech Słota)
Ambassada (2013)

References

External links

1977 births
Living people
Behemoth (band) members
Black metal musicians
Black metal singers
Death metal musicians
Lead guitarists
People from Gdynia
Polish heavy metal guitarists
Polish heavy metal singers
Polish keyboardists
Polish Satanists
University of Gdańsk alumni
English-language singers from Poland
Polish lyricists
Former Roman Catholics
Critics of Christianity
People prosecuted for blasphemy
20th-century Polish  male singers
21st-century Polish male singers
21st-century Polish singers
Polish male guitarists